Expo 2001 is a remix album by Japanese pop band Pizzicato Five. It was released on November 1, 1993 by the Nippon Columbia imprint Triad.

Track listing

Charts

References

External links
 

1993 remix albums
Pizzicato Five albums
Nippon Columbia albums
Japanese-language remix albums